The Armenia women's national football team (Armenian: Հայաստանի ֆուտբոլի ազգային հավաքական) is the national football team of Armenia and is controlled by the Football Federation of Armenia. After the split of the Soviet Union, the team played its first international match. They play their home games at the Mika Stadium in Yerevan. The team's first match was on 10 May 2003 against Austria which they lost 11–0. The team has not qualified for a World Cup or a Women's Euro yet.

History
Armenia played its first match in Waidhofen against Austria, losing 11–0. Three days later they again lost 11–0 against Austria. After these two matches, they played four matches against Slovakia and Greece.

Armenia withdrew from the 2007 World Cup qualification before playing any matches. Later, they played international friendlies in 2007–2009; playing the World Cup qualifiers in November 2009 – August 2010, finishing last with only a goal, 42 conceded and all eight matches lost. Their last competition was the 2013 Women's Euro qualifiers. They Did not enter the 2015 or 2019 FIFA Women's World Cup qualification.

Armenia entered the qualification for 2023 FIFA Women's World Cup. In Group F they thrice managed to lose by just 1 goal margin, but also suffered their heaviest loss ever, with a score of 19-0, to Belgium.

Team image

Nicknames
The Armenia women's national football team has been known or nicknamed as the "Ararat".

Home stadium
Armenia play their home matches on the Mika Stadium.

Results and fixtures
 The following is a list of match results in the last 12 months, as well as any future matches that have been scheduled.

Legend

2022

2023

Coaching staff

Current coaching staff

Manager history

Players

Current squad
The following players were called up for World Cup qualifying matches vs Poland and Albania on April 7 and 12.

Caps and goals accurate up to and including 10 April 2021.

Recent call-ups
The following players have been called up to the squad in the past 12 months.

Records

*Active players in bold, statistics correct as of 30 July 2021.

Most capped players

Top goalscorers

Competitive record

FIFA Women's World Cup

*Draws include knockout matches decided on penalty kicks.

Qualification record
2011 FIFA Women's World Cup qualification – UEFA Group 7

UEFA Women's Championship

*Draws include knockout matches decided on penalty kicks.

Other tournaments

See also

Sport in Armenia
Football in Armenia
Women's football in Armenia
Armenia women's national football team
Armenia women's national football team results
List of Armenia women's international footballers
Armenia men's national football team

References

Notes

External links
 Football Federation of Armenia
 Armenian football portal

 
European women's national association football teams